The 2003 Clipsal 500 was the fifth running of the Adelaide 500 race. Racing was held from Friday 21 March until Sunday 23 March 2003. The race was held for V8 Supercars and was the opening round of the 2003 V8 Supercar Championship Series.

Format
The format, unique to V8 Supercars and loosely similar to the Pukekohe 500 format, split the total distance of 500 kilometres into two separate 250 kilometre races each held on a different day. Points were assigned separately to the races, with more points allocated for Race 2 over Race 1, and they combined to award a round result.

Official results

Top ten shootout
Results sourced from:

Leg 1
Results sourced from:

Leg 2
Results sourced from:

Round results

Statistics
 Provisional Position - #50 Jason Bright - 1:22.2745
 Pole Position - #50 Jason Bright - 1:23.3729
 Fastest Lap - #1 Mark Skaife - 1:23.2731 (new lap record)

External links
 Official race results
 Official V8 Supercar website

References

Adelaide 500
Clipsal 500
2000s in Adelaide